Mohd Khyril Muhymeen bin Zambri (born 9 May 1987) is a Malaysian footballer who plays for Petaling Jaya City in Malaysia Super League as a forward. He also played for the Malaysia national, the Malaysia U-23 and the Malaysia U-20 team.

Club career

Kedah
Born in Alor Setar, Khyril spent most of his career playing for Kedah. He scored 3 league goals in his debut season in 2005.

Negeri Sembilan
On 15 December 2014, Khyril agreed to sign a contract with Malaysia Premier League side Negeri Sembilan.

AirAsia
On 4 February 2016, Khyril signed a one-year contract with third-tier side AirAsia playing for the Malaysia FAM League.

PKNS
On 29 November 2016, Khyril signed a one-year contract with Malaysia Super League club PKNS. He made his debut for PKNS in a 1–0 defeat against Felda United on 21 January 2017. Khyril scored his first goal for the club in a 5–3 home win against Negeri Sembilan on 11 July 2018.

International career
Khyril was hit by a knee injury during representing Malaysia national team in a friendly match against Kenya in September 2009 that sidelined him for seven months. This injury cost him a place in 2009 SEA Games squad. He is fully recovered by April 2010 but far from his best as he performed cautiously to avoid injury.

In November 2010, Kyhril was called up to the national team by coach K. Rajagopal for the 2010 AFF Suzuki Cup. Malaysia won the 2010 AFF Suzuki Cup title for the first time in their history. He ended up the 2012 campaign becoming the team top scorers with 10 league goals, his best scoring tally since 2009 season and 4 goals in Malaysia FA Cup. He alongside his club teammates Baddrol Bakhtiar and Amar Rohidan were called up by coach, K. Rajagobal for the friendlies against Arsenal on 24 July 2012 and Manchester City on 30 July 2012 on their Asia Tour 2012.

Career statistics

Club

International

International goals
Scores and results list Malaysia's goal tally first.

Honours

Club
Kedah
 Malaysia Cup: 2007, 2008
 Malaysia Super League: 2006–2007, 2007–2008
 FA Cup Malaysia: 2007, 2008
 Malaysia Premier League: 2005–06

International
Malaysia
 AFF Suzuki Cup: 2010

References

External links
 

1987 births
Living people
Malaysian footballers
Malaysia international footballers
Petaling Jaya Rangers F.C. players
Kedah Darul Aman F.C. players
PKNS F.C. players
Negeri Sembilan FA players
Perlis FA players
Selangor FA players
Petaling Jaya City FC players
People from Kedah
People from Alor Setar
Footballers at the 2006 Asian Games
Footballers at the 2010 Asian Games
Malaysian people of Malay descent
Association football forwards
Asian Games competitors for Malaysia